Andrea Russotto (born 25 May 1988) is an Italian footballer who plays as a midfielder for  club Catania.

Club career
Hailed as one of the most promising Italian youngsters, he started his career as part of the S.S. Lazio youth system.

Bellinzona and loans
In 2004, Russotto, already a regular in the national youth teams, was approached by football agency GEA World who wanted to represent the rising star. Russotto refused the pressure from GEA and, in order to get away from their continuing pressure, he moved to Switzerland, where he signed for AC Bellinzona, a team from the Italian part of Switzerland that were playing in Swiss Challenge League at the time.
      
In 2005, newly promoted Serie A club Treviso acquired his services on loan but made him play with the Primavera side all season, where he formed a valid striking partnership with Italian youth international Robert Acquafresca. Russotto did later make his debut in Serie A that season, at the age of 17, and completed the season with 4 first team appearances. Famed magazine World Soccer even inserted Russotto on the list of the top 50 young players in the world, as one of only two Italians (the other being Lorenzo De Silvestri).

The following season Treviso extended the loan (although they had been relegated to Serie B) and Russotto finally started to show signs of a potential explosion. He made his Italy U-21 debut at the age of 18 and racked up 32 appearances and 4 goals that season. Treviso extended his loan for one more year in 2007-2008 but even though he played 31 times and scoring 1 goal, Russotto failed to perform at a high level like the previous season and was used mainly as a sub.

In the summer of 2008, he finally returned to Bellinzona, and then left out again on loan, this time to join Napoli in the Serie A, with an option for the Southern Italian side to make the move permanent. However the young trequartista was used sparingly by head coach Edy Reja and his end-of-season substitute Roberto Donadoni, and Napoli then decided not to exercise the buy-out clause and therefore Russotto was sent back to Switzerland again.

He consequently returned in Switzerland, where he spent the first half of the season playing with AC Bellinzona's first team in the Swiss Super League. In January 2010, he was sent on loan (with a permanent move option) to Serie B club Crotone.

Livorno
In summer 2011 Russotto was signed by Serie B club A.S. Livorno Calcio in a definitive deal. On 31 January 2012 he was signed by Carrarese Calcio.

Serie C
In October 2012 Russotto was signed by Lega Pro Prima Divisione club Catanzaro as a free agent. In January 2013 Serie A club Parma signed half of the registration rights of Russotto (by signing Russotto outright and sold back 50% registration rights of Russotto to Catanzaro for a peppercorn fee of €500.). In June 2014 Parma gave up the 50% registration rights for free.

On 16 July 2015 Russotto was sold to Serie B club Salernitana. He played twice for the team in 2015–16 Coppa Italia.

On 31 August 2015 Russotto and Caetano were signed by Lega Pro club Calcio Catania in definitive deals, with Alberto Frison moved to opposite direction in a definitive deal.

On 19 July 2019 he signed with Cavese.

On 14 January 2021 he returned to Catania on a 1.5-year contract. On 9 April 2022, he was released together with all of his Catania teammates following the club's exclusion from Italian football due to its inability to overcome a number of financial issues.

In August 2022, Russotto re-signed for refounded Serie D club Catania.

International career
He made his U-21 team debut against Luxembourg U-21, 12 December 2006, replacing Valerio Virga at half-time and notching an assist. He played once for the U-23 team in a friendly match. He was then placed on reserve for the 2008 Olympics squad and was later called up to replace the injured Claudio Marchisio.

References

External links

 
 

Italian footballers
Italian expatriate footballers
Italian expatriate sportspeople in Switzerland
AC Bellinzona players
Treviso F.B.C. 1993 players
S.S.C. Napoli players
F.C. Crotone players
U.S. Livorno 1915 players
Carrarese Calcio players
U.S. Catanzaro 1929 players
Catania S.S.D. players
A.S. Sambenedettese players
Cavese 1919 players
Swiss Challenge League players
Swiss Super League players
Serie C players
Serie B players
Serie A players
Association football forwards
Footballers from Rome
Italy youth international footballers
Italy under-21 international footballers
Footballers at the 2008 Summer Olympics
Olympic footballers of Italy
1988 births
Living people